VERDE (Visualizing Energy Resources Dynamically on the Earth) is a visualization and analysis capability of the United States Department of Energy (DOE). The system, developed and maintained by Oak Ridge National Laboratory (ORNL), provides wide-area situational understanding of the U.S. electric grid. Enabling grid monitoring, weather impacts prediction and analysis, VERDE supports preparedness and response to potentially large outage events. As a real-time geo-visualization capability, it characterizes the dynamic behavior of the grid over interconnects giving views into bulk transmission lines as well as county-level power distribution status. By correlating grid behaviors with cyber events, the platform also enables a method to link cyber-to-infrastructure dependencies.

VERDE integrates different data elements from other available on-line services, databases, and social media. The Tennessee Valley Authority (TVA) and other major utilities spanning multiple regions across the electric grid interconnection provide real-time status of their systems. Social media sources such as Twitter provide additional data-sources for visualization and analyses.

The VERDE software, which was developed by the Computational Sciences and Engineering Division (CSED) of ORNL, is used outside of the DOE for a number of related national security requirements.

References 

Shankar, M., Stovall, J., Sorokine, A., Bhaduri, B., King, T. (Date 20–24 July 2008) Power and Energy Society General Meeting - Conversion and Delivery of Electrical Energy in the 21st Century, 2008 IEEE Visualizing Energy Resources Dynamically on Earth

Further reading 

Palmer, Katie. (26 September 2011) IEEE Spectrum. Multilayer mapping software sped grid restoration from Hurricane Irene damage

External links 
ORNL VERDE website
VERDE on the DOE Energy Innovation Portal

Scientific visualization
Geographic information systems